Central Savanna Province is one of the fifteen provinces of Cundinamarca, in the country of Colombia.  It is located in the central area of the department, and has 11 municipalities. The province capital is the city of Zipaquirá.

Limits 
 North: Ubaté Province 
 West:  Rionegro and Western Savanna Province 
 South: Bogotá Capital District 
 East:  Guavio Province
 Northeast: Almeidas Province

Rivers 
The Central Savanna Province is crossed by the Bogotá River and Rio Frío.

Demographics  
The most populous urban centers are Chía and Zipaquirá.

Subdivision 
The Central Savanna Province is subdivided into 11 municipalities:

References

External links 
  Government of Cundinamarca Department; Central Savanna Province

Provinces of Cundinamarca Department